Gigantes is a Spanish crime drama television series. The two seasons of the series aired in October 2018 and March 2019, respectively. It has been described as a "story about moral corruption, the dissolution of the family and the extinction of masculinity".

Premise 
The fiction follows the Guerrero, a family based in Lavapiés controlling an extensive criminal network, using the furniture trade as cover. The patriarch of the family, the widowed Abraham Guerrero, built a criminal empire in El Rastro. The three sons of Abraham, Daniel, Tomás, and Clemente have received a backward and toxic upbringing, heirs to a crumbling male-dominant world eating itself up. The three brothers struggle for control of the criminal business.

The bulk of the story has Madrid as background.

Cast

Production and release 
The series was created by Miguel Barros, Michel Gaztambide and Enrique Urbizu, based on the original idea by Manuel Gancedo. The episodes were directed by Enrique Urbizu and Jorge Dorado. The former sausage factory of La Choricera and the Museo Esteban Vicente in Segovia were repurposed as set for some scenes of the first season. The first season consisted of 6 episodes with a running time ranging from to 47 to 58 minutes. It was released on 5 October 2018 on Movistar+.

The filming of the second season took 18 months, shooting in locations of Madrid other than the centre (Moncloa, Chamartín, Herrera Oria, Vallecas), the Madrid region (El Escorial, Villanueva del Pardillo) as well as Portugal (Porto).

The second season, also comprising 6 episodes, was released on 22 March 2019.

Awards and nominations

References 

Television shows set in Madrid
Television shows filmed in Spain
Television shows filmed in Portugal
2018 Spanish television series debuts
2019 Spanish television series endings
Movistar+ original programming
2010s crime drama television series
Television series about organized crime
Spanish-language television shows
Television series about brothers
2010s Spanish drama television series